The name Tecmessa refers to the following characters in Greek mythology:

 Tecmessa, daughter of Teleutas, King of Phrygia, or Teuthras, King of Teuthrania in Mysia, or Tethras or Teuthas. During the Trojan War, Telamonian Ajax kills Tecmessa's father and takes her captive; his reason for doing so may have been, as the 1st-century BC Roman poet, Horace, wrote, that Ajax was captivated by Tecmessa's beauty. In Sophocles' Ajax, Tecmessa unsuccessfully tries to dissuade Ajax from committing suicide. She is the first to find his corpse, which she promptly covers with her own clothing to prevent further heartache. Their infant son, Eurysaces, however, survives the incident.
 Tecmessa, one of the Amazons killed by Heracles in his quest for the girdle of Hippolyte.

Notes

References 

 Diodorus Siculus, The Library of History translated by Charles Henry Oldfather. Twelve volumes. Loeb Classical Library. Cambridge, Massachusetts: Harvard University Press; London: William Heinemann, Ltd. 1989. Vol. 3. Books 4.59–8. Online version at Bill Thayer's Web Site
 Diodorus Siculus, Bibliotheca Historica. Vol 1-2. Immanel Bekker. Ludwig Dindorf. Friedrich Vogel. in aedibus B. G. Teubneri. Leipzig. 1888–1890. Greek text available at the Perseus Digital Library.
 Sophocles, The Ajax of Sophocles edited with introduction and notes by Sir Richard Jebb. Cambridge. Cambridge University Press. 1893. Online version at the Perseus Digital Library.
 Sophocles, Sophocles. Vol 2: Ajax. Electra. Trachiniae. Philoctetes with an English translation by F. Storr. The Loeb classical library, 21. Francis Storr. London; New York. William Heinemann Ltd.; The Macmillan Company. 1913. Greek text available at the Perseus Digital Library.

Princesses in Greek mythology
Amazons (Greek mythology)
Mythology of Heracles